Old Swan is a Liverpool City Council Ward in the Liverpool Wavertree Parliamentary constituency. The boundary was changed for the 2004 Municipal elections losing a small area to the new Tuebrook and Stoneycroft ward and gaining part of the former Broadgreen ward.

Councillors
The ward has returned eight councillors.

Gary Millar left the Liberal Democrats and continued to serve as a Labour councillor in April 2011.

A by-election was held on 19 September after Peter Brennan, who was the serving Lord Mayor of Liverpool, was forced to resign after sharing a racist video on social media.

 indicates seat up for re-election after boundary changes.

 indicates seat up for re-election.

 indicates change in affiliation.

 indicates seat up for re-election after casual vacancy.

Election results

Elections of the 2020s

Elections of the 2010s

Elections of the 2000s 

After the boundary change of 2004 the whole of Liverpool City Council faced election. Three Councillors were returned.

Italics indicate the sitting Councillor.
Bold indicates the winning candidate.

See also
 Liverpool City Council
 Liverpool City Council elections 1880–present
 Liverpool Town Council elections 1835 - 1879

Notes

External links
 Liverpool City Council: Ward profile

References

Wards of Liverpool